Arsamuh (also spelled Arthamukh) was the ruler of the Afrighid dynasty of Khwarezm, ruling during the time of the prophet Muhammad. Arsamuh was the successor of Buzgar, and was later succeeded by Sahr II.

References
 
 

Year of death unknown
Year of birth unknown
6th-century Iranian people
7th-century Iranian people
Afrighids
Zoroastrian rulers